Pendry Hotels and Resorts is a chain of luxury boutique hotels owned by Montage International. As of 2022 it operates seven properties in the United States.

History 
Pendry Hotels and Resorts was founded in 2014 by Alan and Michael Fuerstman as a subsidiary of Montage Hotels & Resorts. Its first hotel was opened in San Diego's Gaslamp Quarter in February 2017, a project that began in 2014. In 2018, it began construction on Pendry Manhattan West, a 21-story hotel located in Manhattan which was completed in 2021. It opened its seventh location in 2022, a 131-room hotel in Washington DC.

Properties 
 
Pendry Hotels and Resorts is a chain of luxury boutique hotels. It also has a residential component at various properties, including Pendry Residences West Hollywood where a condo sold for $21.5 million in 2022. As of 2022, it operates seven properties in locations that include San Diego, Baltimore, West Hollywood, Chicago, New York City, Park City, and Washington D.C.

References

External links
 Official website

Hotel chains in the United States
Hotels established in 2014